Cape Coast North is one of the constituencies represented in the Parliament of Ghana. It elects one Member of Parliament (MP) by the first past the post system of election. The Cape Coast North constituency is located in the Cape Coast Metropolitan District of the Central Region of Ghana.

Boundaries 
The seat is located entirely within the Cape Coast Metropolitan district of the Central Region of Ghana.

Members of Parliament

Elections 
Samuel Kwamena Mintah the current MP for the Cape Coast North constituency.

See also 

 List of Ghana Parliament Constituencies
 Cape Coast Municipal district

References

Parliamentary constituencies in the Central Region (Ghana)